Zahira College, Mawanella (also referred to as Mawanella Zahira) is a Muslim selective entry co-educational school in Mawanella, Sri Lanka. College started as a result of the educational reform that was brought along with the 1920 political reforms. The school was started as a religious school in a cadjan shed which belonged to the Hinguloya Masjidul Huda. It is currently the one of the largest Muslim educational institution in Sri Lanka with more than 4000 students studying there. The college is located in Mawanella next to Masjidul Huda. Zahira means Excellence in Arabic.


History

The birth of the college was a result of the educational reform that was brought along with the 1920 political reforms. The school was started as a religious school in a cadjan shed which belonged to the Hinguloya Masjidul Huda. V. Samuel from Mannar was appointed as the first teacher. On 23 March 1921, the school which was named Hinguloya Tamil Mixed School was registered as a Government School and the first student registered was Dr. A. T. M. A. Azeez. A. M. Abdul Rahman Marikkar and A. M. Majeed Marikkar constructed the building for the school. But until 1943, there was no notable progress to be seen and the classes were only up to Grade Five. In 1943 Grade Six class was started. In 1928, D. L. M. Haniffa was appointed as a Monitor Teacher to the school, and he started the S.S. C. Class in 1946. There were only four students in the class, one of whom was former Principal of Zahira M. C. M. Riyal.

Factors influencing establishment
A historic public speech made by M. C. Siddhi Lebbe in 1891 at the Maradana Mosque Hall (which later became the college mosque) and his appeal to the Muslim community to unite and promote the educational advancement of the community led to the formation of the Colombo Muslim Educational Society. The first Secretary was I. L. M. Abdul Aziz and Arasi Marikar Wapchie Marikar was the first Treasurer and Head Master. With the help of Ahamed Orabi Pasha, an Egyptian exile in Ceylon and freedom fighter, the long cherished dream of Al-Madrasathul Zahira was established. In 1894 the school was registered as a grant-in-aid school Maradana Mohammedan Boys School. After establishing the Zahira College, Colombo the school was established here for the development of the Muslim community in the region as Zahira College, Mawanella.

Progress from 1952 to 1990
The period between 1952 and 1957 was also an important period in the history of Zahira College. Under Headmaster K. M. Samsudeen, girls were first given admission to the school. This enabled many young girls to get teaching appointments. The school started the Science Stream after obtaining the Science Laboratory through the help of the then Minister of Education AL Haj. Badiudeen Mahmood. During this period the school was named as Mawanella Zahira Maha Vidyalaya and with the appointment of the first graduate teacher, M. I. Haja Ameer, the G. C. E A/L classes were started around 1963. One of the students of this batch, Al Haj Y. L. M. Razik, a former principal of the school, was the first to enter the University and became a graduate. 

The Principal who assumed duties in 1967, M. I. Haja Ameer, was a former teacher of this school and was responsible for starting the G. C. E A/L classes.

M. S. A Wahid became principal in 1968. During his tenure, in addition to obtaining electricity supply, Science, Maths and Commerce A/L classes were started.

I. L.M. Shihabdeen was principal from 1974 to 1979. Sir Markan Markar Hall, which was constructed at that time, is the first two-storeyed building of this school. Further, he brought graduate teachers from outstations to conduct special classes for G.C.E.A/L students. The first School Band was formed and he obtained the necessary instruments for it. Grades 10, 11 were made a special section under a Sectional Head and this enabled to obtain good results in the G. C. E. O/L Examination beginning from 1979. A student was selected to the medical faculty for the first time during his tenure. M. C. M. Riyal succeeded him for some time and it was then the primary section building was constructed.

The next stage is the assumption of duty by M. S. A. Wahid again as the Principal. A concrete wall was built around the school compound, the road within the school was improved and with a gate constructed, a security service to the school was started. He reorganized G. C. E. A/L classes to obtain better results. He also made a playground for the school with the co-operation of the public and Inter-House sports meets were conducted for several years in order to develop sports in the school. After Wahid retired, Y. L. M. Razik assumed duties as Principal temporarily, which was later made permanent. He organized the administration and thereby paved the way for the development of this school in all its spheres. The results of the Grade 5 Scholarship Examination, G. C. E O/L and A/L results became records in his time. The school was second only to leading schools like Ananda, Nalanda, and Royal. The school was upgraded to the status of Central College. 

Mohamed Naleer Mohamed Arafath, a grade 8 student represented Sri Lanka Under 19 soccer team at Colombo SAF Games and was the only goal scorer to lead Sri Lanka to victory against India.

After 1990 to present
Mr M. I. Ismail who took charge of the school next moved sociably with his staff, parents and students and did many services to the school that was within his capacity. The period from 14 October 1996 to 4 May 1997 when M. R. M. Zackariya was the Principal of the school is also an unforgettable period in the history of the school. Being active and young he took many steps to remedy the shortcomings that prevailed at that time. An additional fifth class was given to the primary classes where there were only four earlier. Thereby the number of students increased in the Primary section. During his tenure, the school was upgraded as a National School. Amplifier facilities were provided and the new playground was made with the sacrifice and tireless services of M.S.M.Kamil, an old boy and a well-wisher, with the support of the Labour Minister Hon. Athauda Senavirathne and the Pavilion was named after the minister. When twenty-two teachers retired from service at the same time, he was able to fill the gap without creating problems to the educational activities or the administration of the school. Further, he made the canteen function in two sections in order to avoid congestion.

When Mr. A.K.M.Fouz who functioned as the Principal from 5 May 1997 to 18 January 1999 assumed duties; there was a tense situation in the school. But, he was able to face all the challenge with his calm disposition. He invited the Honourable Minister of Health Nimal Siripala De Silva to declare open the Dental Clinic.

Further, he organized an Educational exhibition on a grand scale successfully. Moreover, to improve G.C.E. O/L Maths results, he successfully organized special evening group classes for the students who were weak in Mathematics. These are worthy of mentioning here. Further with the aid obtained from the Saudi Arabian Islamic Development Bank, he was able to obtain instruments and machinery for Construction Technology. And many more services that could be understood by many have been done during his time.

It was during the tenure of his successor Mr. M.H.M.Nizar, that the O.B.A. and the O.G.A. of the school were formed. These associations have done much service and continue to do so. Mr. M.C.Nizardeen assumed duties on 5 July 2000. Though many great services have been done during his time and even though he works tirelessly, it is sad that those services are invisible for many. Computer Learning Centre, Special Education Unit, the Sports Pavilion, the land purchased for the school, the introduction of Hockey, Rugger, Cricket, Carrom to the school sports which enabled our students to participate at national levels, Audio Visual Unit, the wire net fence along the side of the mosque, two classrooms, the photocopier, the Geographer (Digital Printing Machine), the organization of the office room, the G.C.E. A/L Science laboratory, the best A/L results recorded in the history of the school, Rs. 800,000 worth curtain for the auditorium, water supply service and electricity connection to the unconnected areas, the Cultural Hall that has been erected with the help of I.I.R.O., the primary section building block with 30 modern classrooms obtained by inviting the Korean Ambassador with the support and sacrifices of Mr.M.S.M.Kamil, are some of the services of his time.
Another after him his successor Marhoom I Abdul Hakeem, brought a vast change to the school, education, school environment and the logo of the school which prevailed for the long period was changed. The school was traveling towards a rapid development in curricular and extracurricular activities. He was a remarkable and courageous gentleman, never bowing down to any external forces or so-called Islamic movements. He was killed in an accident.

His successor Mr Naeem Marrikkar, too, followed the footprints of the previous principal. After him, MR I.A Usana overtook his duties as the principal but due to some unavoidable reasons, the school had give up the principal. Again Mr. Nizardeen who once served as the principal took the responsibility too serves the school.

Teachers
Most of the teachers who serve the school are former Zahira students.

Awards

Societies and clubs
Prefects Guild
Students' Media Forum
Photographic Society
Scouts
Cadets
ICT Society
Interact Club
Environment Society 
Aesthetic Club
Health club
New invention club
Science club
Student parliament

Passtout students forums

Old Zahirians Media Association - OZMA
Old Cadet Association - OCA
Zahirians Rugby Union - ZRU
Zahira Old Basketball Association - ZOBBA
Old Zahirians Alumni- xZahirians

Sports
Football
Rugby - awarded as a Best Rugby team in Subragamuwa province
Basketball - 2009, 2010 Province Runner-up's and the Champions of Kegalle District
Karate
Volleyball
Athletic - College has made lot of island champions in athletic such as short distance runners, javelin throwers, high jumpers etc.

References

External links
 OBA - Old Boys Association
 xZahirians

Schools in Kegalle District